Network for Electronic Transfers, colloquially known as NETS, is a Singaporean electronic payment service provider. Founded in 1985, by a consortium of local banks, it aims to establish the debit network and drive the adoption of electronic payments in Singapore. It is owned by DBS Bank, OCBC Bank and United Overseas Bank (UOB).

The NETS Group (comprising NETS, BCS and BCSIS) provides a full suite of payments and financial processing services including direct debit and credit payments at point-of-sale (NETS) and online (eNETS), mobile payments (NETSPay), card services (CashCard, FlashPay card), electronic funds transfer (FAST, Paynow, GIRO) and payment and clearing solutions (Real-Time Gross Settlement, Cheque Truncation System). NETS is also a member of the Asian Payment Network (APN) and a council member of UnionPay International.

History
NETS was first introduced to the public on 27 June 1985 as a 2-month pilot project involving 10,000 ATM card holders from the five local banks, namely DBS Bank, OCBC Bank, UOB, POSB Bank and OUB through 64 terminals installed at participating government offices, supermarkets, department stores and petrol kiosks. The service was officially launched on 18 January 1986, allowing 1.3 million ATM card holders to make transactions through the initial NETS network of 195 terminals located in various retail outlets and by 1993, consumer spending through NETS reached S$1.14 billion.

In 2020, NETS Group signed a long-term lease to two full floors and a ground-floor unit, at Boustead Projects’ development, 351 on Braddell.

Acceptance
NETS operates Singapore's national debit scheme enabling customers of DBS Bank, POSB, HSBC, Maybank, OCBC Bank, Standard Chartered Bank and UOB to make payments using their physical/contactless ATM cards or mobile devices at more than 120,000 acceptance points in Singapore including major retailers, food courts, hawker centres, convenience stores and supermarkets.

The nationwide acceptance infrastructure is the largest in Singapore and includes 54,000 Unified Point-of-Sale (Unified POS) terminals (which accept NETS, NETS FlashPay, debit and credit cards such as VISA, Mastercard, American Express, UnionPay, RuPay and JCB) and 94,000 QR acceptance points (for payments via NETSPay, PayLah!, Pay Anyone and Mighty). In 2011, NETS’ debit system was designated as national payment system by the Monetary Authority of Singapore (MAS).

In November 2018, it was announced that NETS can be used at 4,500 acceptance points in Malaysia, allowing users of NETS enabled cards issued by DBS, POSB, OCBC Bank and United Overseas Bank.

Card services

CashCard
NETS introduced the 1st generation chip-based CashCard in 1995. The CashCard is a stored value card that is predominantly used as a payment mode for Singapore's Electronic Road Pricing (ERP) and car park charges since the introduction of the in-vehicle unit in 1997. The CashCard can also be used for retail purchases.

vCashCard 
In May 2015, NETS launched vCashCard, a virtual wallet for road tolls payment that allows motorists to drive through Singapore's Electronic Road Pricing (ERP) gantries seamlessly. Road toll payments are automatically charged to their bank accounts or debit/credit cards. With NETS vCashCard, motorists do not need to worry about forgetting to insert a physical CashCard/FlashPay into the in-vehicle unit or having insufficient value in the CashCard/FlashPay and paying unnecessary ERP admin fees. Motorists can sign up for auto top-up service and view their ERP transactions at the vCashCard website or NETS vCashCard app from App Store or Google Play.

Contactless CashCard
In May 2018, the 2nd generation contactless CashCard was released. The CEPAS CashCard card is based on the same specifications of the CEPAS FlashPay card, thus both cards can be used interchangeably. The Contactless CashCard was rebranded NETS Motoring Card in March 2021.

FlashPay

The Singapore Government launched CEPAS 2.0 (Contactless e-Purse Application), a Singaporean specification of a common standard for electronic money smart card, in 2009. The transit market was opened to more issuers enabling NETS to participate and subsequently launch the NETS FlashPay card on 9 October 2009.

FlashPay is a multi-purpose contactless stored value smart card that can be used for a huge variety of quick payments at/on – MRT/LRT, public buses, taxis, ERP gantries (with the dual-mode in-vehicle unit), car parks (which have been upgraded to accept CEPAS-compliant cards) and 102,000 retail acceptance points island-wide. It is comparable to the Octopus card in Hong Kong. Compared to EZ-Link, FlashPay is accepted at more retail shops, including most convenience stores, supermarkets, and fast food restaurants.

In October 2010, NETS launched the Auto Top Up service for the NETS FlashPay card, allowing commuters to automatically top up the value on their cards to a predetermined amount (S$30, S$40 or S$50) when it runs low or when there is insufficient stored value on the card to make payment at all MRT and LRT stations, public buses, ERP gantries and EPS (upgraded) carparks.

The FlashPay Reader app was released in February 2016 for Android devices with NFC capabilities. It allows topping up of FlashPay cards using NFC-enabled Android phones, with debit cards and credit cards as payment options. Cardholders can also check their card balance, card expiry date, view the last 30 transactions, register for Auto Top-Up by Credit/Debit Card and view RSVP balance with the FlashPay Reader.

Payment types

NETS EFTPOS
NETS EFTPOS is a nationwide infrastructure that enables DBS, HSBC, Maybank, OCBC, POSB, UOB and Standard Chartered Bank customers to make purchases at points-of-sale using their ATM cards. The NETS EFTPOS service is available at more than 130,000 acceptance points throughout Singapore.

NETS Unified POS 
NETS Unified POS was introduced to accept contact/contactless, credit and debit payments on one terminal. The terminal accepts NETS, NETS FlashPay, debit and credit schemes such as VISA, MasterCard, American Express, UnionPay and JCB, cards issued by partnering banks (e.g. BCA bank), as well as NFC-enabled mobile wallets like Apple Pay, Android Pay and Samsung Pay. NETS Unified POS can be integrated with loyalty programmes, prepaid services and point-of-sale via Electronic Cash Register interface.

eNETS 
eNETS is an online payment gateway services. It enables payment from all major credit cards and currencies as well as Direct Debit (internet banking payments) from the major banks in Singapore and China, including DBS (Singapore and Hong Kong), UOB, OCBC, Citibank and BNU.

NETS eCommerce 
NETS eCommerce was launched in 2016 to provide a quick and affordable end-to-end solution to set up webstores. The solution is integrated with secured payment options using eNETS Debit and Credit.

NETS Contactless, NETS QR, and NETSPay 

NETSPay is a digital wallet app. Launched in October 2017, it introduces 2 new payment options for NETS debit, NETS Contactless and NETS QR. NETS Contactless is supported on Android devices via NFC and HCE, and NETS QR is supported on Android & iOS devices via QR code.

ATM cardholders can digitise their bankcards with the app, replacing the debit card chip and PIN transaction at point-of-sale terminals that have been upgraded to accept contactless and QR code payments. Fingerprint ID or passcode authentication is required to access the app, with a user configurable session timeout. No PIN is required for transactions below $100.

NETS Contactless ATM cards were launched from the first quarter of 2018. In December 2018, NETS Contactless cards issued by DBS/POSB, UOB, OCBC began to be accepted for LTA's public transport account-based ticketing trial.

Payment terminals
These terminals are issued to retailers to accept NETS debit, NETS FlashPay/CashCard, debit/credit card payments.

The launch of NETS QR and NETS Contactless in October 2017 required merchants' payment terminals to undergo a software update, as previously only chip-and-pin NETS debit payment was available. Merchants may display decals in stores to advertise acceptance of QR and contactless payments. Customers can identify if NETS QR and NETS Contactless are accepted by looking at the options listed on the payment terminal's menu.

Comparison of payment modes

Card payments

Online payments

ATM switching services 
NETS provides local and regional ATM switching services for banks. NETS partnered with Malaysian Electronic Payment System (MEPS) in Malaysia to enable bilateral cross-border ATM withdrawal services, and UnionPay in China to enable its cardholders to make purchases and withdraw cash from ATMs in Singapore. India also made a deal in 2018 wherein Indian RuPay Cards have acceptance in Singapore and same for the Singaporean counterpart in India.

Gallery

See also
 Monetary Authority of Singapore

References

1986 establishments in Singapore
Financial services companies established in 1985
Financial services companies of Singapore
Mass Rapid Transit (Singapore)
Singaporean brands
Singaporean companies established in 1985